Harrison McKay (born 24 December 1997) is a professional Australian rules footballer playing for the Carlton Football Club in the Australian Football League (AFL). In 2021, McKay won the Coleman Medal, awarded to the season's leading goalkicker.

Career
A key forward, McKay played junior football at Warragul and state under-18s football with the Gippsland Power. He was drafted by Carlton with a first-round selection (No. 10 overall) in the 2015 national draft. He missed much of the 2016 season—his first season in the professional system—with stress fractures in his back, and he made his senior debut for the club in Round 18, 2017.

McKay began to command a regular place in the Carlton forward line in 2018, and he was soon the club's primary spearhead. He won his first club leading goalkicker award in 2019 with 26 goals and was named forward pocket in that season's 22under22 team; he then led the club's goalkicking again in the pandemic-shortened 2020 season with 21 goals. He had a breakout season in 2021, serving as a deep full-forward. He was among the strongest contested marks in the league. He kicked 58 goals for the season to win the Coleman Medal by a four-goal margin, which was both the most goals and first Coleman Medal by a Carlton player since 2009.

A natural left-foot kick, McKay favours taking set shots from the right side of the ground with a perpendicular run-up and snap kick, even from relatively narrow angles; he still favours the conventional drop punt from the left side of the ground.

Family
McKay is the mirror twin brother of fellow professional footballer Ben McKay, who plays as a key defender at North Melbourne. As of 2022, the two are yet to play an AFL game against each other despite seven years in the league, often as a result of one of the two being suspended or withdrawn late with injury, leading to internet jokes that they are the same player running a fake-twin gambit.

Statistics
Statistics are correct to the end of Round 21 2021

|- style="background:#EAEAEA"
| scope="row" text-align:center | 2017
| 
| 10 || 2 || 3 || 2 || 11 || 4 || 15 || 7 || 1 || 1.5 || 1.0 || 5.5 || 2.0 || 7.5 || 3.5 || 0.5
|-
| scope="row" text-align:center | 2018
|  
| 10 || 13 || 21 || 11 || 103 || 35 || 138 || 70 || 23 || 1.6 || 0.9 || 7.9 || 2.7 || 10.6 || 5.4 || 1.8 
|- style="background:#EAEAEA"
| scope="row" text-align:center | 2019
| 
| 10 || 20|| 26 || 30 || 161|| 46|| 207|| 125|| 32|| 1.3|| 1.5 || 8.05|| 2.3|| 10.35|| 6.25|| 1.7
|- style="background:#EAEAEA; font-weight:bold; width:2em"
|-
| scope="row" text-align:center | 2020
|  
| 10 || 13 || 21 || 15 || 76 || 21 || 97 || 57 || 20 || 1.6 || 1.2 || 5.8 || 1.6 || 7.5 || 4.4 || 1.5 
|- style="background:#EAEAEA"
|-
| scope="row" text-align:center | 2021
|  
| 10 || 19|| bgcolor=CAE1FF | 58† || 33 || 154 || 31 || 185 || 113 || 27 || bgcolor=CAE1FF | 3.1† || 1.7 || 8.1 || 1.6 || 9.7 || 6.0 || 1.4
|- style="background:#EAEAEA"
| scope="row" text-align:center class="sortbottom" colspan=3 | Career
| 67
| 129
| 91
| 483
| 130
| 593
| 340
| 96
| 1.8
| 1.3
| 6.5
| 1.9 
| 8.4
| 4.7
| 1.4
|}

References

External links

1997 births
Living people
Twin sportspeople
Carlton Football Club players
Gippsland Power players
Australian rules footballers from Victoria (Australia)
Coleman Medal winners